Ren Xiong (July 19, 1823 – November 23, 1857) was a Chinese painter from Xiaoshan, Zhejiang, active during the late Qing dynasty. Ren belonged to the Shanghai School in Chinese painting and is known for his bold and innovative style.

His brother was the painter Ren Xun.

According to the scholar Meccarelli, the particular definition of pictorial naturalism, might result from contacts established with the art of photography, rather than a “simple” assimilation of Western painting techniques and models.

Paintings

References

Further reading

External links
Innovations in Chinese Painting (1850 - 1950)

1823 births
1857 deaths
Artists from Hangzhou
Qing dynasty painters
19th-century Chinese painters
Painters from Zhejiang
Chinese male painters
19th-century male artists